Everett Ernest Blakely (July 1, 1919 – September 21, 2004) was a career officer of the United States Air Force.  He was a highly decorated B-17 pilot with the  “Bloody Hundredth” Bombardment Group of the 8th Air Force in Europe during World War II. He received eleven medals for his service including the Silver Star for “gallantry in action”, the Distinguished Flying Cross for “heroism or extraordinary achievement during aerial flight” and the Air Medal with 4 oak leaf clusters. Blakely and the crew of his plane “Just A Snappin” long held the record for the most enemy aircraft shot down on a single mission.  The crew of Just A Snappin was credited with 9 enemy aircraft shot down. He also received his Pilot Wings with 3 stars from the Colombian Air Force.

The Tom Hanks/Steven Spielberg made for the Apple TV mini-series, "Masters of the Air" is a story of the 100th Bomb Group in World War II. Actor David Shields plays the role of Blakely. The series is based on many books including "Masters of the Air" by Donald Miller and "Wing and a Prayer" by Harry Crosby.

Biography 
Everett Blakely was born on July 1, 1919 to Everett Palmer Blakely and Gottleiben (Libby) Shellenberger in his family home in Elgin, Illinois.  Blakely had one brother, Robert Blakely (October 1, 1920- November 26, 2013) who served with distinction as an infantry officer and helicopter pilot in the U.S. Army, until his retirement as a major.

Everett and his brother were raised in Seattle, Washington by their stepmother Gwendolyn Matthews. Everett's father worked at the Olympic Hotel in Seattle. Everett attended Lincoln High School and graduated from Queen Anne High School in 1938. After high school graduation, Everett attended the University of Washington where he studied Latin American Studies and served in the Reserve Officer Training Program (ROTC). There he earned his Sharpshooter classification.

Blakely was a graduate of the University of Washington and from 1942 until 1969 served as an officer in the United States Air Force. Blakely was one of the original B -17 pilots of the 418th Bombardment Squadron of the 100th Bomb Group. The 100th Bomb Group became known as the “Bloody 100th”  because of the many early losses they suffered during the beginning of the US bombing campaign in Europe. He served not only as a Command Pilot but was also the group commander of the 418th Bombardment Squadron and Station Training Officer stationed at Thorpe Abbots Air Field in England.

Early Training in the U. S. Army Air Corps 
In August 1941, before graduating from the University of Washington Everett enlisted in the U.S. Army Air Force.

His first assignment was at Hancock Field in Santa Maria, California where he was stationed from August 22, 1941 to November 1, 1941. It was at Hancock Field that he learned to fly using the Stearman PT13 biplane.

He began his next assignment on November 4, 1941  at Moffett Field near San Francisco, California.

Pearl Harbor, and the subsequent entry of the United States into what became known as World War II, happened one month later, on December 7, 1941.  Everett continued his flight training on a Vultee BT-13 Valiant (Vibrator), concluding this assignment at Moffet Field on January 17, 1942.

Told he would fly fighters, cadet Blakely transferred to Luke Field, Arizona were he received advanced fighter training on a North American T-6 Texan. No longer a cadet he graduated earning his pilot wings and he was commissioned as a Second Lieutenant.

On March 16, 1942, Everett was transferred to the 3rd Air Force stationed at Dale Mabry Field in Tallahassee, Florida where he continued his fighter flight training, flying the Bell P-39 Airacobra, Curtiss P-36 Hawk and the Republic P-43 Lancer.

About 3 months later, he was assigned to the 79th Fighter Group at Morris Field in Charlotte, North Carolina where he continued to hone his flying skills, flying the Curtiss P-40 Warhawk.

Blakely's goal of becoming a fighter pilot changed on May 31, 1942 when he was assigned to the 3rd Bomber Command at MacDill Field in Tampa, Florida and began training and flying the most famous bomber of World War II, the B-17.

As his skills continued to develop Blakely was transferred to the 29th Bomber Group at Gowen Field in Boise, Idaho on August 20, 1942 and later that month to the 330th Bomber Group at Briggs Field in El Paso, Texas where he was assigned to the 459th Bomber Squadron where he began training with his first crew. His crew would change slightly during the war.

More training continued with the 333rd Bombardment Group at the Army Air Base in Topeka, Kansas, followed up with the 96th Bomber Group in Rapid City, South Dakota.

Everett finally connected with the 100th Bomb Group on October 28, 1942, officially assigned at Walla Walla Army Air Base in Washington. Blakely spent the rest of World War II working with the 100th Bomb Group. He was promoted to 1st Lieutenant on November 11, 1942. In the "Second Phase" of training at Walla Walla Army Air Base formation flying, and aerial gunnery were emphasized.
In December 1942, Blakely was briefly assigned to Wendover Airfield, Utah for operational training with the 100th Bomb Group.

In January 1943, Everett continued training with the 100th Bomb Group at Sioux City Army Air Base in Iowa. While stationed at the Sioux City Air Base, Everett attended a local dance where he met the lovely Margaret Ann Spence. They married about two months later while he was stationed at Gowen Field in Boise, Idaho. He remained madly in love with Margaret for over 62 years until his death on September 21, 2004.

Training was completed on May 20, 1942 after flying the new B17  in Wendover Field, Utah, and subsequent brief stints at Hamilton Field, California and Kearney, Nebraska.

On May 25, 1943, Everett and some of his crew flew their B-17 to Thorpe Abbot airfield in England. Their route took them first to Dow Field in Bangor, Maine then across the North Atlantic to Labrador and then on to Preswick, Scotland before landing at his base in England. His ground crew boarded the Cunard White Star liner Queen Elizabeth for the trip to England.

World War II 
In early June 1943, Blakely arrived at Thorpe Abbots, England.  The United States Army Air Force (USAAF) had been created on June 20, 1939 and the first B-17E arrived in High Wycombe, England under the Command of General Ira C. Eaker on May 12, 1942. The first mission of the USAAF was on August 17, 1942 against the railroad yards in Rouen-Sotteville, France.

Everett Blakely served in the 418th Bomber Squadron of the 100th Bombardment Group of the 8th Air Force in Europe. He was stationed in England at Thorpe Abbots Airfield. Thorpe Abbots was Station # 139 in operation from June 1942 to 1944 with its primary function as a B -17 base.

Over the years two B-17s were assigned to Blakely and his crew. The first B-17F, assigned in 1942 was plane # 42 30061, named Just A Snappin.   In August 1943 this plane was assigned to the Robert Wolff crew and became known as Wolff Pack.  Because Blakely piloted the lead crew he received a newer B-17F #42-23393. This plane retained the name Just A Snappin. Blakely's plane was also sometimes called "The Provisional Group".

According to Harry Crosby's book " A Wing and a Prayer", on the mission to Saint Nazaire, Blakely's plane limped back to Thorpe Abbot,"We kid Blakely about flying alone. We call him 'The Provisional Group,' an outfit that comes to the base to replace missing crews. He responds, 'We were behind you, just a-snappin' at your heels'. that's where he got the name for his plane."Blakely was an original pilot assigned to the 418th Bomber Squadron. He had a humble demeanor and was well respected by everyone in the 100th Bomb Group.

From William R. Fogle's Journal - 100th Bomb Group (Heavy) Foundation (100thbg.com)"Captain Blakely, one of our best-liked and most able pilots, brought his Ship 393 back from Germany on two engines, crash-landing in or near Norwich. One of the waist gunners, Saunders, got a belly full of lead and lived for a while, but finally died. Later, Captain Blakely was made the new CO. Everyone will like that, I'm sure."

Missions 
The list of missions in which Everett Blakely participated is incomplete. As one of the original crews assigned to Thorpe Abbotts Blakely usually served as lead pilot of his bomb group. After the mission to Bremen on October 8, 1943, Blakely's plane was destroyed. He was promoted to squadron commander of the 418th Squadron. After this promotion he flew many missions as a Command Pilot. In late 1944 he became the base Training Officer.

VIII Bomber Command Mission Number 67: -- The first mission of the 100th Bomb Group was to Bremen, Germany on June 25, 1943. Blakely's plane was crippled and he struggled to get it back to his base. Three planes of the 100th Bomb Group are lost on the first mission for this unit.

VIII Bomber Command Mission Number 69: -- The second mission of Blakely and the 100th Bomb Group was to Saint Nazaire on June 28, 1943. The primary target was the submarine pens at Saint Nazaire and a German fighter base at Beaumont- Le Roger. B17s including the bombers of the 100th Bomb Group are dispatched to St. Nazaire. At Saint Nazaire there was intense flak but no fighter attack. The B-17s on this mission had support from the RAF Spitfires and the USAAF Thunderbolts. Blakely's plane lost two engines but was able to get back to the base. Of the 191 planes launched on this mission, there were 8 losses.

.VIII Bomber Command Mission Number 71: -- The fourth mission for the 100th Bomb Group and Everett's mission #3 was to the sub pens at  La Pallice, France on July 4, 1943. On the mission to La Pallice a total of 71 B-17s hit the target with the loss of 1 B-17 from the 100th Bomb Group and 1 plane was damaged. Additional targets were aircraft factories at Le Mans and Nantes. Reports indicate that bombing was extremely accurate. This mission lasted 10 hours and 45 minutes.

VIII Bomber Command Mission Number 72: -- On July 10, 1943,  Blakely's mission #4 was to Le Bourget Airfield near Paris, France. They were flying #230061 Just A Snappin. 101 B-17 were dispatched against Le Bourget Airfield, Paris. The 100th BG was credited with destroying 4 enemy air craft and losing one b-17. The weather over the target was bad resulting in no bomb drop.

The last week of July 1943 became known as Blitz Week. A period of USAFF aerial bombardment during the 1943 Combined Bomber Offensive of World War II where air raids were conducted on six of seven days as part of Operation Gomorrah,

VIII Bomber Command Mission Number 75: -- On July 24, 1943 the 8th Bomber Command sent heavy bombers to multiple targets in Norway. The 100th Bomb Group flew to the: sub pens in Trondheim, Norway.  Harry Crosby joined the Blakely crew as Navigator on this mission. This was a 1,900-mile mission and the longest to date. It required over 12 hours in the air. When flying over water, the B-17s flew at low altitude to conserve oxygen. The 100th BG had no losses for this mission and were credited with two enemy fighters destroyed. The 100th BG had good results from their bombing. Everett Blakely received the Distinguished Flying Cross for his actions on this mission.

VIII Bomber Command Mission Number 76: -- The second mission of Blitz Week was on July 25, 1943. The 100th BG flew to Warnemunde and Kiel in Germany. The 100th BG were part of a force of 141 B-17. The targets were the Heinkel aircraft factory at Warnemunde and the shipyards and U-boat base in Kiel. Warnemunde was covered in heavy clouds so the dock yards of Keil were bombed instead. The 100th BG lost one plane with a crew of 10 on this mission. One of the targets was Bergen but it was covered in clouds and because of the USAAF policy, no indiscriminate bombing was to occur at this point of the war.

VIII Bomber Command Mission 81: -- On August 12, 1943 the 100th Bomb Groups mission was launched, and the target was Wessling and its synthetic oil production facility. The primary targets were obscured by fog as were the secondary and tertiary targets. The Bonn railroad yard was a target of opportunity. Everett Blakely was flying Just A Snappin with Harry Crosby as lead navigator.  According to Crosby,"It just happened that the night before, after I had been given a pre-briefing, I had returned to my quarters and was playing some records on what in England was called a gramophone . I had the complete Third Symphony (Eroica) and the complete Fifth Symphony. As I played the records, I rather idly read the inscription on the inside cover of the album. I noticed without paying much attention that Beethoven had been born in and had gone to school in Bonn.

On the next day, 25,000 feet in the air, when we started our run on Bonn, I looked down and saw a series of buildings which I presumed to be the University of Bonn. Instantly there flashed through my mind the thought, ‘That must be where Beethoven went to school!

I grabbed Douglass by the shoulder and said we would not go to Bonn. Over the intercom someone asked me why not and, after giving the pilot a new heading, I explained that this was where Beethoven went to school.

In those tense moments for some reason nobody objected, and we made a run on a marshaling yard in Cologne which was listed as a target of opportunity. We were the lead ship in the whole Eighth Air Force that day and therefore the entire formation followed us.”VIII Bomber Command Mission 84: -- One of the most famous air battles of World War II came next for “The Bloody 100th. On August 17, 1943 the 100th Bomb Group joined other heavy bombers from the 8th Air Force on a historic two-pronged attack on Schweinfurt-Regensburg. This mission marked the deepest penetration into Germany to date. Captain Blakely in Just A Snappin was the 100th Bomb Group lead pilot for this mission. The entire 8th AF sent 146 B 17s to Regensburg. 100th Bomb Group sent 21 B-17s on this mission. 14 of those planes hit the target. Nine planes of the 100th were listed as missing with 17 men killed, 59 men became POWS, and 10 airmen ended up interned in Switzerland. The Americans met over 300 Luftwaffe fighters that downed 24 planes and a loss of over 200 men. The 100th Bomb Group lost 9 aircraft. The execution of the plan to bomb two major targets did not go as planned. The group led by Captain Blakely was sent to Regensburg to bomb a Messerschmitt Aircraft factory. After hitting the target, this group headed out over the Alps and on to Algeria. Every important building in the complex at Regensburg was damaged. Colonel Curtis LeMay was group leader on the Regensburg mission. Blakely was flying a new plane on this mission. B-17F #23393 with the same name-Just A Snappin. The 100th Bomb Group received its first Presidential Unit Citation  for this mission. This mission to Africa took the 100th BG over 11 hours. On September 29, 1943 Captain  Blakely received the Distinguished Flying Cross from Curtis LeMay for his valor on this mission.
VIII Bomber Command Mission 88: -- On the way back from Algeria on August 31, 1945, the 100th Bomb Group, led by pilot Captain Blakely flew to Thorpe Abbot,  and on the way back attacked an airfield at Bordeaux-Merignac. No 100th BG  planes were lost on this mission.

VIII Bomber Command Mission 91: -- The 8th AF set a new record in number of heavy bombers dispatched on September 6, 1943 to Stuttgart.   The mission was to bomb the Daimler and Porsche factories, an air base in Conches, SKF ball bearing factory and a Bosch factory where 90% of the German magnetos were produced. Because of cloud cover, the bombers had to circle around the city three times before dropping their bombsThe 100th BG lost 3 aircraft during this mission while destroying 9 enemy fighters.

VIII Bomber Command Mission 93 and 94: -- As a rehearsal for the upcoming D Day invasion, the 8th Air Force initiated “Operation Starkey” to multiple targets in France on September 9, 1943. Unfortunately, Luftwaffe participation was weaker than expected as it had been hoped that many more would have been destroyed. Of the 63 B-17 sent to Beauvais/Tille Airfields six are damaged and all targets were successfully bombed. The convoy was supported by P-47 fighters.

VIII Bomber Command Mission 95: -- An ME 109 reconditioning plant, a Renault motor works and a ball bearing plant near Paris were the next targets on September 15, 1943, with a flight time of 5 hours.  The 100th BG lost one plane and were credited with 5 enemy aircraft destroyed.

VIII Bomber Command Mission 97: -- On September 16, 1943 Captain Everett Blakey was flying as 100th Bomb Group lead pilot on Just A Snappin. Once again, the 100th was tasked with bombing a U Boat base in France.

VIII Bomber Command Mission 100: -- Major Flesher, Group Air Exec flew with Blakey on the mission to Vannes on September 23, 1943, whose target was the port of Vannes. No planes from the 100th BG were lost on this mission.

VIII Bomber Command Mission 104: -- On September 27, 1943 the target was the port area of Emden.  This mission that lasted 6 hours.  Since Emden was near the water, this mission was to use the new Pathfinder planes and the H2S radar scopes where the contrast between the land and water would easily show up. This is the first mission to use the  Pathfinders. 308 B 17s are sent on this mission. The division loses 7 planes and the 100th BG lost none.

VIII Bomber Command Mission  106: -- The 100th returned to Emden on October 2, 1943.There was a total of 340 heavy bombers launched on this mission, with 7 losses. The 100th BG had no losses.

October 8, 1943 to October 13, 1943 became known as Black Week. The Air Force sustained more losses this week than in any other week in history.
VIII Bomber Command Mission 111: -- The primary target of the 100th BG on October 8, 1943 was the town of Bremen. This was Blakey's 18th mission. This is the first mission in which strips of aluminum were used to jam German radar.  Seven aircraft of the 100th Bomb Group were lost on this mission. For the entire 8th AF, 399 planes were launched with 357 making the attack and 30 losses.  On this day, the crew of Just A Snappin was credited with shooting down nine Nazi fighters - still a record today for a single plane on a single mission during this war. Two engines were knocked out. The plane lost altitude and almost had to ditch in the North Sea. Staff Sergeant Lester Saunders, the waist gunner, was sadly killed in action on this mission. 22 planes from the 100th Bomb Group flew this mission. Just A Snappin was heavily damaged, and crash landed at an unused RAF base in England. Five crew members were injured and received purple hearts. The salvage crew counted over 800 holes in the B-17 from flak, machine gun bullets and 20 mm cannon shells. Everett Blakely received our nation's 2nd highest medal of honor, the Silver Star for his bravery that day.

Blakely's Crew on this faithful mission:

Major John Kidd- Command Pilot
1st Lt. Everett Blakely-Pilot

2nd Lt. Charles Via – Formation Officer in the tail (SWA on this mission)

1st Lt. Harry Crosby – Navigator

2nd Lt. James Douglas – Bombardier

T/Sgt. Edmund Forkner -Radio Operator

S/Sgt. William McClelland – Ball Turret Gunner (Wounded in Action on this mission)

S/Sgt Edward Yevich – Waist Gunner (Wounded in Action on this mission)

S/Sgt Lyle Nord – Waisted Gunner

S/Sgt. Lester Saunders – Tail Gunner (Killed in Action on this mission)

Following the harrowing mission to Bremen, Blakely was promoted to Major and became the 418th Bomber Squadron Commander from October 1943 to April 18, 1944. Later in 1944, Major Blakely became the Group Training Officer. Returning to the States he was preparing to fight in the Pacific theater of war when the atomic bombs were dropped on Hiroshima and Nagasaki ending the war.

World War II ended in Europe on May 7, 1945, with the end of war in Japan following on September 2, 1945.

After the War 

After the war, Blakely was sent to Williams Air Force Base in Tempe Arizona where he became the Director of the Post Mechanics School.

The Servicemen's Readjustment Act of 1944 (G.I. Bill) program was used by Blakely to finish up his education at the University of Washington where he earned a degree in Latin American Studies.

After graduation in 1948, Blakely attended the Army Language School in Monterey, California where he became fluent in Spanish language.

Putting his Spanish to good use, he and his family were stationed in Cali, Colombia where he served as an advisor to the Colombian Air Force. He was honored by the Colombian Air Force with the receipt of Colombian Pilot Wings. Blakely served in Colombia from 1949 to 1952.

Blakely's next assignment was as Group Commander of Training at Norton Air Force Base near San Bernardino, California.  From 1953 to 1954, Blakely served as Acting Base Commander.

Blakely was then stationed at Warner Robins Air Force Base near Macon, Georgia from 1954 to 1957 in the capacity of Director of the Plans and Programs Division.

After this stateside assignment, Blakely was transferred overseas to Clark Air Force Base in the Philippines where  he served as the Director of the Communication Engineering Division from 1957 to 1960.

Stateside once again, United States Lt. Colonel Blakely became the Air Force ROTC Director at the University of Notre Dame in South Bend, Indiana from 1960 to 1965. While at Notre Dame, he earned his master's degree in Guidance and Counseling.

Next Blakely was assigned the task of cleaning up and closing down Toul Rosieres Air Base near Nancy, France. Charles de Gaulle, French Prime Minister at that time, ordered all American military installations to be removed from France, while remaining a member of NATO.  After closing down the facility, Blakely was reassigned as Assistant Director for Materiel of the 26th Tactical Reconnaissance Wing at Ramstein Air Force Base near Kaiserslautern, Germany.

After 27 years serving as an officer in the United States Air Force, Blakely retired from his military career, returning to California where he worked at Lockheed Air in Burbank, California.  Retiring from Lockheed in the late 1980s, he and his wife, Margaret moved to San Luis Obispo, California in 1989. 

Blakely died on September 21, 2004 at the age of 85 and is buried in the Old Mission Catholic Cemetery in San Luis Obispo.

Awards and citations

References 

1919 births
2004 deaths